K. P. Satheesh Chandran is a political party leader of the Communist party of India, Marxist, (CPIM), in Kasargod, Kerala. He was contesting as the candidate for Kasargode constituency in the 2019 Indian general elections.  Elected as MLA to Kerala Legislative assembly in 1996 and 2001, he holds B.A. in Economics and History. He entered politics through students federation of India.  He was SFI Unit Secretary at Govt. College Madappally, was Joint Secretary (1984), Secretary (1985–91) and President (1991–94) of the DYFI, Kasargod District Committee, DYFI State Vice President and Central Executive Committee Member since 1991; Member CPI (M) Kasargod District Secretariat.

He was born to  Shri. K.K. Govidan Nambiar and Smt. Kunju Lakshmi Amma at Pattena, Nileshwaram on 23 November 1957.

References

Living people
1957 births
People from Kasaragod district
Communist Party of India (Marxist) politicians from Kerala
Kerala MLAs 1996–2001
Kerala MLAs 2001–2006